The following is the discography of Wavves, an American rock band, formed in San Diego, California in 2008 by singer-songwriter Nathan Williams.

Albums

Studio albums

Collaborative albums

Extended plays

Singles

Guest appearances

Music Videos 
{| class="wikitable plainrowheaders" style="text-align:center;" data-ve-attributes="{"style":"text-align:center;"}"
! scope="col" style="width:16em;" data-ve-attributes="{"style":"width:16em;"}" |Title
! scope="col" |Year
! scope="col" href="B.o.B." |Ref."No Hope Kids"2009
|-
! scope="row" |"So Bored"
|"Post Acid"2010
|-
! scope="row" href="Billboard (magazine)" |"King of the Beach"
| rowspan="2" |2011
|"Bug"
|-
! scope="row" href="Billboard (magazine)" |"Sail To The Sun"
|2012
|
|-
! scope="row" | "That's On Me"
| rowspan="3" |2013
|"Demon To Lean On""Afraid of Heights""Way Too Much"2015"My Head Hurts""Million Enemies"2017
|-
!scope ="row" | "Stupid in Love"
!
|}

Notes

References

External links
 Official website

Punk rock group discographies
Alternative rock discographies
Discographies of American artists